Lemos is a Portuguese-language surname. It can be also Greek (Λεμός).

Notable people by that name include:

Portuguese surname 

 Álvaro Lemos (born 1993), Spanish professional footballer.
 Amanda Lemos (born 1987), Brazilian mixed martial artist
 Ana Cláudia Lemos (born 1988), Brazilian track and field athlete.
 Daniel Soares de Sousa Lemos (born 1990), Brazilian footballer.
 Gaspar de Lemos (15th century), Portuguese explorer.
 Manuel Gayoso de Lemos (1747–1799), Spanish governor of Louisiana.
 Tiago Lemos, Portuguese football player
 Waldemar Lemos (born 1954), Brazilian football head coach.

Greek surname 
 Costas Lemos (1910–1995), Greek billionaire shipping tycoon.
 Lemos family, prominent Greek ship owning family.
 Michael Lemos (born 1955), London-based Greek heir.

Portuguese-language surnames
Greek-language surnames